Bardon Hill railway station was a railway station in Leicestershire, England, on the Leicester and Swannington Railway, which later became part of the Midland Railway's Leicester to Burton upon Trent Line.

The village of Bardon was built to serve the large granite quarry on Bardon Hill. The quarry has for many decades provided significant freight traffic for the railway, and in about 1990 the village was demolished to let the quarry expand. British Railways had closed Bardon Hill station in 1952 but the line remains open for freight traffic.

References

Former Midland Railway stations
Disused railway stations in Leicestershire
Railway stations in Great Britain closed in 1952